was a Japanese sprinter. He competed in the men's 100 metres and the 200 metres events at the 1924 Summer Olympics.

He graduated from Meiji University and worked for the Japanese Government Railways, among other jobs. By 1924 he had changed his surname to Tani. In November 1925, at the age of 31, he became the first Japanese sprinter to break the 11-second mark in the 100 metre dash. He died in 1956.

References

External links
 

1894 births
1956 deaths
Sportspeople from Okayama Prefecture
Japanese male sprinters
Olympic male sprinters
Olympic athletes of Japan
Athletes (track and field) at the 1924 Summer Olympics
Japan Championships in Athletics winners
Meiji University alumni